The following is a list of the 528 communes of the Calvados department of France.

The communes cooperate in the following intercommunalities (as of 2020):
Communauté urbaine Caen la Mer
Communauté d'agglomération Lisieux Normandie
Communauté de communes de Bayeux Intercom
Communauté de communes Cingal-Suisse Normande
Communauté de communes Cœur Côte Fleurie
Communauté de communes Cœur de Nacre
Communauté de communes Intercom de la Vire au Noireau
Communauté de communes Isigny-Omaha Intercom
Communauté de communes Normandie-Cabourg-Pays d'Auge
Communauté de communes du Pays de Falaise
Communauté de communes du Pays de Honfleur-Beuzeville (partly)
Communauté de communes Pré-Bocage Intercom
Communauté de communes Seulles Terre et Mer
Communauté de communes Terre d'Auge
Communauté de communes Val ès Dunes
Communauté de communes Vallées de l'Orne et de l'Odon

References

Lists of communes of France